The Latin Axis was a proposed alliance between European Latin countries during the Second World War. This project was proposed to Italy by Romanian politician Mihai Antonescu, who served as Deputy Prime Minister and Foreign Minister during World War II, under Ion Antonescu.
The alliance would have included Romania, Italy, Vichy France, Spain, and Portugal. As a consolidated bloc in a region of German weakness, he hoped that it might become a significant counterweight to the Reich. Germany supported the proposal for the Latin Bloc during World War II and German propaganda assisted Italian propaganda in promoting the bloc. However, the alliance failed to materialize. Germany's Führer Adolf Hitler promoted the Latin Bloc and in October 1940 travelled to Hendaye, France, on the border with Spain to meet Franco with whom he promoted Spain forming a Latin bloc with Italy and Vichy France to join Italy's fight against the United Kingdom in the Mediterranean region.

See also
 Latin Bloc (proposed alliance)
 Little Entente
 Croatian–Romanian–Slovak friendship proclamation
 Intermarium
 Little Entente of Women
 Balkan Pact
 Balkan Pact (1953)
 Polish–Romanian alliance

References

Politics of World War II